Brian Hoffman may refer to:

 Brian Hoffman (musician), Deicide founder and guitarist
 Brian M. Hoffman (born 1941), American bioinorganic and physical chemist